Anstey Nomads Football Club is a football club based in Anstey, Leicestershire, England.

History
The club was established in 1946 by a merger of Anstey Methodists and St Mary's under the name Anstey Meths and Mary's. They joined the Central Division of the Leicestershire Senior League, Anstey Methodists having been members of the league prior to World War II, and were Central Division runners-up in their first season. The following year the club was renamed Anstey Nomads, and when the league was reorganised in 1948, they were placed in Division One.

In 1951–52 Anstey won Division One, a feat they repeated in 1953–54. In 1955 the club also started playing in Division One of the Central Alliance, and left the Leicestershire Senior League at the end of the 1955–56 season. For 1956–57 the club were placed in Division One South of the Central Alliance, where they remained until being transferred to Division One North in 1958. A year later they were moved back to Division One South. The club finished bottom of the division in 1960–61, but with several clubs leaving the league, they were placed in the new Premier Division. In 1967 the club switched to the Premier Division of the East Midlands Regional League.

In 1973 Anstey rejoined the Leicestershire Senior League and were placed in Division Two. They won the division at the first attempt, earning promotion to Division One. After finishing as runners-up for three successive seasons from 1979 to 1981, the club won back-to-back titles in 1981–82 and 1982–83. They were runners-up again in the renamed Premier Division in 1985–86 and 1990–91, with their next title coming in 2008–09, resulting in promotion to the East Midlands Counties League. At the end of the 2017–18 season, the club were transferred to Division One of the United Counties League.

Anstey's first season in the United Counties League saw them finish as runners-up in Division One, earning promotion to the Premier Division. When the league's top division was split in two in 2021, the club were placed in the Premier Division North.

Ground

Anstey Nomads have played their home games at Cropston Road since their formation. Facilities include a clubhouse with licensed bar, changing rooms, car parking and sheltered seating and standing for spectators.

Honours
Leicestershire Senior League
Premier Division/Division One champions 1951–52, 1953–54, 1981–82, 1982–83, 2008–09
Division Two champions 1973–74
League Cup winners 2008–09
Leicestershire and Rutland Senior Cup
Winners 1994–95
Leicestershire Junior Cup
Winners 1994–95
Battle of Britain Cup
Winners 2008–09, 2011–12
Rollestone Charity Cup
Winners 2008–09

Records
Record attendance: 4,500 vs Hayes, FA Amateur Cup second round, 1954–55
Best FA Cup performance: Fourth qualifying round, 2022–23
Best FA Vase performance: Fifth round, 1995–96, 2020–21, 2021–22

See also
Anstey Nomads F.C. players

References

External links
Official website

Football clubs in England
Football clubs in Leicestershire
Association football clubs established in 1946
1946 establishments in England
Leicestershire Senior League
Central Alliance
East Midlands Regional League
East Midlands Counties Football League
United Counties League